Zero reject is an educational philosophy which says that no child can be denied an education because they are "uneducable". It is part of the Individuals with Disabilities Education Act (IDEA), which is the main special education law that seeks to guarantee free and public education for students with disabilities. Because of this policy, the services that have been previously inaccessible to this group of learners are already routinely provided. Zero reject also include additional components such as the requirement for general education placements to be age- and grade-appropriate in keeping with its inclusion philosophy.

Background 
The origin of zero reject policy and IDEA can be traced back to the Education of All Handicapped Children Act passed by the U.S. Congress in 1975. IDEA replaced this law in 1990, which also underwent a succession of amendments starting in 1997. The law aims to facilitate the movement of qualified individuals with disabilities from their home, their school, and into mainstream employment.

One of the six core principles of IDEA states that no child with a disability can be denied a free appropriate public education. It requires that schools receiving federal funding must educate all children with disabilities without conditions and exceptions. This principle applies regardless of the nature or severity of the disability; no child with disabilities may be excluded from a public education. The requirement to provide special education to all students with disabilities is absolute between the ages of 6 and 17. If a state provides educational services to children without disabilities between the ages of 3 to 5 and 18 to 21, it must also educate all children with disabilities in those age groups. Each state education agency is responsible for locating, identifying, and evaluating all children, from birth to age 21, residing in the state with disabilities or who are suspected of having disabilities. This requirement is called the child find system.

The zero reject principle also ensures that students with communicable diseases (e.g. AIDS) cannot be excluded from schools. Secondly the principle also stands behind children who have committed serious offenses, so they're not suspended from school long-term.
Friend, Marilyn. Special education: contemporary perspectives for school professionals. 3rd ed. Allyn & Bacon, Inc., 2011.

References

Philosophy of education